The Ajlun offensive, also known as the Battle of the Scrubland, was a military offensive launched by the Jordanian army against fedayeen bases in the Ajlun area the fedayeen's last stronghold.

Background 

In September 1970, heavy fighting erupted between Jordanian forces and the Palestinian fedayeen. At the urging of the Arab heads of state, Hussein bin Talal and Yasser Arafat signed the cease-fire agreement in Cairo on 27 September. The agreement called for rapid withdrawal of the guerrilla forces from Jordanian cities and towns to positions "appropriate" for continuing the battle with Israel and for the release of prisoners by both sides.

The offensive 
On 12 July, the Jordanian government ordered the trapped Fedayeen to evacuate Tal al-Aqra, the strategic location. The guerrillas did not respond to the order. On the morning of 13 July, the Jordanian army began its offensive with intensive artillery bombardment reinforced by the air force. The force began to crawl on the positions of the Fedayeen from three sides, where there were about 500 guerrillas on the outskirts of the Jordan Valley. On the morning of 16 July, the army announced its control of the whole area after the killing of about 250 guerrillas, and suffered more than 200 injuries. About 500 Fedayeen managed to withdraw and reach Syria.

Footnotes 

Black September
1971 in Jordan
July 1971 events in Asia